The Isidora Sekulić Award is a Serbian, and former Yugoslav, literary prize established by the Belgrade municipality of Savski venac in 1967 and awarded annually since 1968 in honor of the writer and Belgrade native Isidora Sekulić. The award honors writers for the best work of modern Serbian literature of the previous year. In the first decade of its history, several authors were awarded annually. Since 1979, only one author has received the award each year. A total of 71 authors (60 male and 11 female) have received the award since its inception.

List of laureates

References

Awards established in 1967
1967 establishments in Yugoslavia
Yugoslav awards
Serbian literary awards
Serbian literature